Trockau is a village in the district of Bayreuth, in Bavaria, Germany, with about 550 inhabitants.

Bayreuth (district)
Villages in Bavaria